The International Ocean Shipping Building is a 50-floor 232 meter (762 foot) tall skyscraper completed in 2000 located in Shanghai, China.

Part of the building is occupied by the Novotel Atlantis Pudong Shanghai hotel, with 303 guest rooms. The 50th floor is home to a revolving restaurant.

See also
 List of tallest buildings in Shanghai

External links
 
 

Hotel buildings completed in 2000
Office buildings completed in 2000
Buildings and structures with revolving restaurants
Skyscrapers in Shanghai
Skyscraper office buildings in China
Retail buildings in China
Skyscraper hotels in Shanghai